The city of Rome was besieged in AD 549–550 by the Ostrogoths, led by Totila, during a campaign to recapture Italy from the Byzantine Empire. After Totila imposed a blockade, soldiers from the city's garrison opened the gates to him. Many of the male inhabitants were killed in the city or while attempting to flee. The city was afterwards repopulated and rebuilt.

Background
At this time Totila, military and political leader of the Ostrogoths, was attempting to re-conquer the whole of Italy from the Byzantine emperor Justinian and his great general, Belisarius. Belisarius, under Justinian, aimed to conquer all of Italy and restore it to its former glory. After Belisarius conquered much of Italy, including the Ostrogoths' capital, Ravenna, the Ostrogoths appointed Totila to power and took back much of Italy as soon as Belisarius returned to Constantinople. These Gothic Wars laid waste to much of Italy.

In 549–550, Totila, the Ostrogothic leader, besieged Rome for the third and final time. With Belisarius' return to Constantinople the summer before, Totila encountered less difficulty than previously in the campaign. The Ostrogoths had attempted to besiege Rome twice before, but had failed or were defeated by Belisarius.

The siege
Totila first attempted to capture Rome by storming the walls and overpowering and exhausting the small Roman garrison of 3,000, but to no avail. He then decided to blockade the city and starve out the defenders, rather than losing any more of his own soldiers. Totila understood that a blockade could take months or years, but was in a far better position than the last siege attempt and decided it was the best course of action. The Byzantine commander Diogenes had previously made preparations of food stores, had wheat fields sowed, and made ready the city walls in preparation for a long-lasting blockade.

The Roman soldiers, suffering from hunger and mistreatment from Justinian, were given a choice by Totila: to open the gates of the city, surrender, and be paid a hefty sum, as the garrison had done during the second siege; or continue fighting for Justinian, who had not paid the men in years, and be killed. Some of the soldiers decided to side with Totila and opened the gate for him. Totila’s men entered the city and destroyed the unsuspecting Roman garrison.  They swept through the city, killing and looting all but the women, who were spared on the orders of Totila. Expecting the nobles and the remainder of the garrison to flee as soon as the walls were taken, Totila set traps along the roadways to neighboring towns that were not yet under his control. Many Romans were caught by ambush while fleeing Rome. Only a few, including Diogenes, the Roman commander, escaped Totila’s takeover of Rome and his roadside ambush.

Aftermath
In earlier sieges Totila had intended to destroy Rome, but once he had captured the city, he decided to repopulate and rebuild it, and defend it against all future attacks from Justinian.

References
 Bury, J.B. "History of the Later Roman Empire." Reconquest of Italy (2011): n.pag. Web. 19 Nov 2012. 
 Morris, Charles. "Fall of the Ostrogoths." Wars of the Ostrogoths (2007): n.pag. Web. 19 Nov 2012. 
 Tisi, Claudio. "Vandalic and Gothis Wars." Sardinia (2002): n.pag. Web. 19 Nov 2012. 

Rome
Rome
540s in the Byzantine Empire
550s in the Byzantine Empire
Rome
Rome 549-550
Gothic War (535–554)
Massacres of men
Military history of Rome
Rome 549-550
Violence against men in Europe